Tell It to My Heart may refer to:

 Tell It to My Heart (album), by Taylor Dayne, 1988
 "Tell It to My Heart" (Meduza song), featuring Hozier, 2021
 "Tell It to My Heart" (Taylor Dayne song), 1987
 "Tell It to My Heart", a season five episode of Degrassi: The Next Generation
 "Tell It to My Heart", a song by Jem from the 2016 album Beachwood Canyon